The Lion Has Wings is a 1939 British, black-and-white, documentary-style, propaganda war film that was directed by Adrian Brunel, Brian Desmond Hurst, Alexander Korda and Michael Powell. The film was produced by London Film Productions and Alexander Korda Film Productions and 'was preparing the nation [for war] and shining a light on the power of the RAF'.

The Lion Has Wings was made at the outbreak of World War II and was released to cinemas very quickly. It helped convince the British government of film's value for disseminating both propaganda and information.

Plot
The Lion Has Wings is recounted in various 'chapters' with a linking story revolving around a senior Royal Air Force (RAF) officer, played by Ralph Richardson, his wife and his family.

The film opens with a newsreel-style documentary comparing life in Britain to life in Nazi Germany, narrated by E.V.H. Emmett in the upbeat and patriotic narrative style common to such newsreels in Britain. This mainly uses existing newsreel footage with some additional footage shot especially for the film. It includes scenes from Fire Over England with Queen Elizabeth I giving her speech to the troops at Tilbury about repelling invaders. It also compares the relaxed lifestyles and openness of the British Royal Family and the British people with the militarism of Nazi Germany by including footage from the Nazi propaganda documentary Triumph of the Will.

The second chapter shows an early bombing raid on German warships in the Kiel Canal. Although it was mainly recreated in the studio, and with special effects, it also includes some footage of the real bombers and their crews returning from the raid.

The third chapter shows an attack by Luftwaffe bombers, and how it is repelled by the RAF, with assistance from the Observer Corps and barrage balloons.

The epilogue has Mr. and Mrs. Richardson taking a break from their duties, enjoying an afternoon by the river. She gives a stirring speech about how the women of Britain have in the past given their sons and lovers to the land and to the sea, and must now give them to the air. They will do so willingly to defend all that is fair and kind about the British way of life. But Wing Commander Richardson is so tired he falls asleep part way through her speech.

Cast
Merle Oberon as Mrs. Richardson
Ralph Richardson as Wing Commander Richardson
June Duprez as June
Flora Robson as Queen Elizabeth I (Footage taken from Fire Over England)
Robert Douglas as Briefing officer
Anthony Bushell as Pilot
Brian Worth as Bobby
Austin Trevor as Schulemburg
Ivan Brandt as officer
G. H. Mulcaster as Controller
Herbert Lomas as Holveg
Milton Rosmer as Head of Observer Corps
Ronald Adam as Bomber Chief
Robert Rendel as Chief of Air Staff
Archibald Batty as Air Officer
Derrick De Marney as Bill
Bernard Miles as Observer Controller
E. V. H. Emmett as Narrator, UK (voice)
Lowell Thomas as Narrator, US (voice)

Production
At the outbreak of war, there were fears that all film production would be halted and cinemas closed, as they were during World War I. Alexander Korda was close friends with Winston Churchill, and was very aware of current events. As soon as war was declared, Korda pulled staff from other productions to fulfill his promise to Churchill that he would have a feature propaganda film ready within one month of the outbreak of war.

Since The Lion Has Wings was made before the attacks on Britain had begun, the film had to rely on existing stock footage, including sequences lifted from the air raid featurette, The Gap. Contemporary aircraft, many of which were obsolete by 1939, are a noticeable jarring element. The footage of a German bomber taking off is actually a German airliner (Focke-Wulf Fw 200); at least, it has the correct markings, but most of the biplane aircraft featured in the RAF air show were obsolete fighters. The addition of footage that was shot at operational bases, RAF Hornchurch, Hornchurch, Essex, and RAF Mildenhall, Suffolk, England, combined with studio work at Denham Studio, Denham, Buckinghamshire, UK, lent an air of authenticity to the production.

To ensure rapid progress, the film had three directors, and was shot simultaneously in various locations. Michael Powell was assigned the task of recreating the RAF bomber raids, and his taut and well-structured section stands up the best, while Brian Desmond Hurst's sequences include Merle Oberon and Ralph Richardson which brought 'the undoubted stardust he managed to sprinkle with the help of his leading actors' <ref>Theirs is the Glory. Arnhem, Hurst and Conflict on Film” Page 275. Co-authored by David Truesdale and Allan Esler Smith. Published 16 September 2016 by Helion and Company. </ref> which helped fill the cinemas. Adrian Brunel, the last of the three credited directors, was responsible for the spy and 'crisis' scenes. Powell later remarked that the project was 'all shop-made, edited, and directed in less than a month'.

Reception
The speed of production and the multiple directors shows in the final result, but it is an effective 'message' film. It was all shot in 12 days, and completed in about four weeks, at a cost of just £30,000, a notable achievement in those times. Within days of its release, copies had been shipped to 60 countries. Although it is difficult to determine its actual impact on the public, The Lion Has Wings was considered a significant factor in persuading the British government to allow the film industry to continue to work, and the film was regarded as a model of how filmmakers could be an asset to the war effort.

Like many propaganda films, The Lion Has Wings does not tell the whole truth, but there are many elements of truth in it. The use of radar as a defensive measure was not mentioned, since it was still a secret. However, the bombing raids were shown first being reported by spies then confirmed by the Observer Corps, a tactic that was actually occurring as part of Britain's defensive measures. The film also shows Luftwaffe bombers trying to attack London, but being completely turned back by barrage balloons, which in reality had little effect on the raids. The use of RAF fighters intercepting and attacking enemy bombers at night was not feasible at that point. These errors or misinterpretations added to other lofty claims that Britain had sufficient aircraft in production and was quite ready to fight to counter the overwhelming numbers of Luftwaffe raiders; all purposeful exaggerations were intended to bolster morale.

Public reaction was generally reserved, as British audiences saw The Lion Has Wings as patently simplistic and patronising; yet, it was a commercial success. Powell later derided the project as 'an outrageous piece of propaganda, full of half-truths and half-lies, with some stagey episodes which were rather embarrassing and with actual facts which were highly distorted...'

Author of The Rise and Fall of the Third Reich, William Shirer recounts in his Berlin Diary on 10 June 1940 that he thought the film 'very bad, supercilious, and silly'. He was shown the film at the German Propaganda ministry while working as a CBS Radio news reporter.

Home video
This film is available on DVD from:
 DD Home Entertainment coded for Region 2 (UK & Europe)
 Magna Pacific coded for Region 4 (Australasia)
 Criterion as an extra included on their release of The Thief of Bagdad coded for Region 1.

BooksTheirs is the Glory: Arnhem, Hurst and Conflict on Film takes Hurst's Battle of Arnhem epic as its centrepiece and then chronicles Hurst's life and experiences during the First World War and profiles each of his other nine films on conflict, including The Lion Has Wings.

References
Notes

Bibliography

 Aldgate, Anthony and Jeffrey Richards. Britain Can Take it: British Cinema in the Second World War. Edinburgh: Edinburgh University Press, 2nd Edition. 1994. .
 Barr, Charles, ed. All Our Yesterdays: 90 Years of British Cinema. London: British Film Institute, 1986. .
 Dolan, Edward F. Jr. Hollywood Goes to War. London: Bison Books, 1985. .
 Hardwick, Jack and Ed Schnepf. "A Viewer's Guide to Aviation Movies". The Making of the Great Aviation Films, General Aviation Series, Volume 2, 1989.
 Johnston, John and Nick Carter. Strong by Night: History and Memories of No. 149 (East India) Squadron Royal Air Force, 1918/19 – 1937/56. Tonbridge, Kent, UK: Air-Britain (Historians) Ltd., 2002. .
 Murphy, Robert. British Cinema and the Second World War. London: Continuum, 2000. .
 Michael Powell. A Life in Movies. London: Heinemann, 1986. .

 David Truesdale and Allan Esler Smith.  Theirs is the Glory. Arnhem, Hurst and Conflict on Film Helion and Company, 2016. 

External links
 
 
 The Lion Has Wings reviews and articles at the Powell & Pressburger Pages
 
 
  – full synopsis and film stills (and clips viewable from UK libraries)
 www.briandesmondhurst.org – official legacy website of the co-director with filmography including The Lion Has Wings''

1939 films
1930s English-language films
British aviation films
Films shot at Denham Film Studios
London Films films
British black-and-white films
Battle of Britain films
British World War II propaganda films
Films by Powell and Pressburger
Films directed by Adrian Brunel
Films directed by Brian Desmond Hurst
Films directed by Alexander Korda
Films directed by Michael Powell
Films produced by Alexander Korda
Films scored by Richard Addinsell
1930s war films
British World War II films
1930s British films